

Karl Adolf Christian Brocks (29 January 1912 – 29 May 1972) was a German meteorologist who was a member of the Geophysical (later Meteorological) Institute of Hamburg University. In 1960 he was appointed full professor and head of the Institute. During World War II, he served in the Wehrmacht and was a recipient of the Knight's Cross of the Iron Cross of Nazi Germany.

World War II awards
 Knight's Cross of the Iron Cross on 30 September 1944 as Hauptmann of the Reserves and regimental adjutant of Grenadier-Regiment 123

References

 
 

1912 births
1972 deaths
Scientists from Kiel
People from the Province of Schleswig-Holstein
Recipients of the Knight's Cross of the Iron Cross
German Army officers of World War II
German meteorologists
Academic staff of the University of Hamburg
Military personnel from Kiel
German science writers